Anstruther railway station served the village of Anstruther, Fife, in Scotland. Served by the Leven and East of Fife Railway it was opened in 1863.

History

First station was opened by the Leven and East of Fife Railway in 1863 and was resited in 1883 . In 1887, a  separate  company extended the line to St Andrews and 10 years later it became part of the North British Railway. From 1923 it became part of the London and North Eastern Railway. The line then passed on to the Scottish Region of British Railways on nationalisation in 1948. The station was then closed by the British Railways Board in 1965

Sources 
 
 
 
 

Disused railway stations in Fife
Railway stations in Great Britain opened in 1863
Railway stations in Great Britain closed in 1965
Beeching closures in Scotland
Former North British Railway stations
1863 establishments in Scotland
1965 disestablishments in Scotland